This is a list of classes and characters in South Korean 2.5D side scrolling MMORPG Elsword, developed by KOG and published by Nexon.

Playable characters 
In the world of Elsword, players are able to choose classes by choosing a character, each with their own backgrounds and characteristics. As their level advanced, players are able to choose one out of three available job path (four for Rose). Each job path specializes in different fields and background story, as well as affecting a character's personality.

Elsword (Knight) 
An ambitious but hot-headed young swordsman, he was trained by the commander of the Crimson Knights—his older sister—Elesis. Prior to the start of the game, Elesis left Elsword to lead a mission, never to return.

Elsword is the leader of the El search party and is now searching the land for two things—El, the precious gems that power his kingdom, and his missing sister. As a swordsman, he is capable of executing swift attacks with one hand or strong blows with two. He uses his sword 'Great Sword' and his basic fire abilities to eliminate his foes.

Elsword's special feature is called Way of The Swords, which lets him to enter two kinds of mode: Destruction Aura and Vitality Aura. During Destruction Aura, certain commands and skills have an increased damage output. Also, getting hit while in Destruction Mode causes Elsword to Stoic Break, knocking all enemies back and gaining Super Armor for its duration. During Vitality Aura certain commands restore mana faster with certain skills requiring less mana.

He is 13 years old on base job, 14 on first job, 16 on second job, and 18 on third job. Elsword is voiced by Jeong Yu-mi (Korean), Kenichi Suzumura (Japanese), and Nicolas Roye (English).

Class Advancement

Aisha (Magician) 
Aisha Violet Landar was already a mage of the highest order at the tender age of 12 until a ring of sinister power absorbed her abilities. Intelligent and brash, she joined the El search party and once again starts her journey to relearn all that she lost and to find the ring that she is capable shooting fire balls with magic from her hands. For melee, she attacks with her Staff. If Aisha stands still, she meditates, rapidly recovering mana. Aisha's feature is called Memorize. One second of charging activates Memorize mode. Using a skill during this mode uses its mana cost and puts it on cooldown, but 'memorizes' it. She can use the memorized skills (maximum of 3 memorized skills) with no additional mana cost, but at a reduced 70% damage.

She is 15 years old on base job, 16 on first job, 18 on second job, and 20 on third job. Aisha is voiced by Rhee Ji-yeong (Korean), Rie Kugimiya (Japanese), and Dania Cericola (Italian).

Class Advancement

Rena (Ranger) 
Rena Forest Erindell is an elf living in the mortal world. Her place in this world is jeopardized by the weakening of El, the power gems that energize everything including the connection to her home world. If this power fades, the ties that bind the two planes will vanish, as will Rena herself. She joined the El search party and uses her abilities as a Ranger to protect the El and her friends. As an Elven warrior, she excels both at melee combat and archery, and can also combine both techniques.

Rena fights with bow for long range and for melee she uses her legs to kick. Her features are mana charge and Nature Orbs (shortened as NF). She is able to summon the NF to assist her in battle. She gains 1 NF per 6 attacks, maximum of 5 NF. When using a skill, NF is consumed to ignore defense and prevent knockdown. Some skills requires a certain amount of NF to be activated. During Awakening, Rena does not require NF to activate skills, but will not trigger the NF bonus. When Rena has 3 or more NF, she gains increased Charge and speed. Like Aisha, if Rena stands still, she starts charging, increasing her mana regeneration although not as fast as Aisha.

As an elf, Rena's aging is slower than humans, and her age is never stated. Rena is voiced by Jeong Mi-sook (Korean), Yui Horie (Japanese), Alessandra Karpoff (Italian), and Cristina Vee (English).

Class Advancement

Raven (Taker) 
Raven Mercury Cronwell was a soon-to-be captain of the Mercenary Knights. Unfortunately, he was framed by his own best friend Owen and lost everything including his comrades and fiancee Series, who were killed in their attempt to escape. While he was dying, the Nasods found him and dragged him off, modifying his left arm to be a Nasod Arm. After going berserk and destroying nearly everything in the lab, he met Elsword, whom he later joined with to find the missing El Shards.

As a half-Nasod with Nasod Arm, Raven wields a sword in one hand to deal fast slashes using Nasod Arm to deal devastating punches and blast fireballs. His feature is called Anger of Raven, which he activating Awakening to summons his Nasod Arm Core. They deal damage when a skill is used, or they greatly reduce damage taken when hit. Nasod Arm Core is consumed completely when launched and is consumed slowly when blocking. Additional Core charges can be gained by hitting enemies or getting hit. If Raven actives Awakening Level 3, he will be shrouded in lightning, dealing damage to nearby enemies. Additionally, his Nasod Arm Core capabilities are greatly enhanced.

He is 24 years old on base job, 26 on 1st job, 27 on 2nd job, and 29 on 3rd job. Raven is voiced by Bak Seong-tae (Korean), Mamoru Miyano (Japanese), Paolo Sesana (Italian), and Brian Beacock (English).

Class Advancement

Eve (Nasod) 
Eve Nasod was an upper-class Nasod who once was called "The Little Queen of Nasods," back when Humans and Nasods coexisted in Ancient Elrios. The times were peaceful and they worked side by side with their creators. However, the reign of prosperity was fleeting, as the power of El began to weaken. Nasod civilization declined without its power source. They sought help from the humans but were denied and, thus, the Nasod-Human war began. Years passed with the humans winning the ancient war but at the same time diminished the El's power. Only a few ancient Nasods survived the war and made it back into their preservation capsules. For thousands of years, Eve was preserved in her capsule unit to avoid the catastrophe until an El fragment accidentally flew into it. Eve woke up only to find out that she was stranded alone in this new present time. She gathered her remaining energy and ancient knowledge and joined the El search party to revive King Nasod and the Nasod race as the last Nasod in the world.

Eve uses her powers of machinery to take down enemy forces for her. She can summon Nasods from her kingdom to aid her in her battle. A dash-jump causes Eve to 'Glide', increasing movement speed that diminishes over time. Eve can dash multiple times in the air, granting her high Air Mobility.

She fights along with her two Nasod assistants: Moby and Remy. Eve's features are Queen's Core and Code: Recovery. Activating awakening summons Queen's Core to aid her in battle. It shoots lasers when skills are activated and blocks damage completely when attacked. It is consumed completely when attacking and is consumed slowly when blocking. Additional Core charges can be gained by attacking enemies or by getting hit. Also, at the expense of Core charges, she can 'backslide', escaping from additional hits. Activating Awakening Level 3 boosts Queen's Core, significantly increasing its damage and blocking capabilities as well as its recharge speed. When Queen's Core is deactivated (when the awakening duration runs out), Eve gains health and mana depending on the level of the awakening. Code: Recovery lets Eve to recover some of her HP using her MP, gaining a different buff depending on her job path.

Her age is listed as unknown due to being a Nasod created during the ancient times. Eve is voiced by Woo Jeong-shin (Korean), Mamiko Noto (Japanese), Loretta Di Pisa (Italian), and Brianna Knickerbocker (English).

Class Advancement

Chung (Guardian) 
The family was known as the protectors of Hamel City, the capital of Senace Kingdom—it is to this name that Chung was born. Widely known as Prince Seiker ('Prince' being his given name, not a title), Chung was trained for combat from his early years. When Senace Kingdom came under attack, his father devoted himself to defending it. Unfortunately, a demon possessed him, causing him to lose all control of his own body, and the noble fighter unwittingly came to lead the enemies to attack Hamel. Prince Seiker tried to hold his father to try and stop him, but was seriously wounded. With the help of Elsword and his friends, Chung escapes the battlefield and is on his way to recovering from his wounds. Meanwhile, most parts of Senace are now occupied by the demons. He then decides to leave Hamel to the Crimson Knights and go with Elsword and his friends in the El search party to train and become stronger than ever. He swears to himself that he will not use the Seiker name and will call himself Chung until he returns to save Hamel and take the Water El back from the demons. In battle, he fights using a big cannon named "Destroyer" as both melee and ranged weapon.

Chung's feature is called Freiturnier. He is able to reload his cannon as well as turned it unlimited when he entered a berserk mode—a mode where he was fully armored as well as gaining some benefits that differs according to his job path.

He is 13 years old on base job, 15 on 1st job, 16 on 2nd job, and 18 on 3rd job. Chung is voiced by Yang Jeong-hwa (Korean), and Miyuki Sawashiro (Japanese).

Class Advancement

Ara (Little Xia) 
Ara Meimei Haan is a skilled martial artist who fights with a spear. She comes from a village called Fahrmann, which was destroyed years ago by a demon named Ran, Who possessed her older brother Aren Han. After that, she formed a contract with a silver haired fox named Eun.

Ara's special features are the orb spirits and her fox appearance. As a martial artist, Ara is a highly versatile character with an extremely long melee attack range, as well as superior attack speed and mobility, having an air-dash in addition to the double jump. Ara is able to 'cancel' certain skills with another skill, sometimes gaining Spirit Orbs when done so. This enables her to chain Actives and Special Actives with ease, even if that skill is not in the skill slot. Her skills may use Spirit Orbs, Mana, or both. Spirit Orbs can be obtained by certain skills and grants her access to certain skills. Activating Awakening Level 3 will turn her to the Nine-Tailed Fox, gaining increased health, damage, defense, and speed. In this mode, she gains 1 Spirit Orb each time she kills an enemy. However, due to this, Ara's skills have a lower damage than other characters.

She is 17 years old on base job, 19 on 1st job, 20 on 2nd job, and 22 on 3rd job. Ara is voiced by Yeo Min-jeong (Korean), Satomi Satō (Japanese), Emanuela Pacotto (Italian), and Dina Sherman (English).

Class Advancement

Elesis (Free Knight) 
Elesis Scarlet Sieghart is a talented knight and older sister of Elsword. She is able to evade and gap close with extreme effect unlike her brother Elsword, who incorporates a more defensive fighting style. In addition to her swordplay with her 'Claymore', Elesis is capable of harnessing and expressing energy into fire, enhancing her combat efficiency. She is also considered a collaboration character of Elsword and its predecessor Grand Chase. She was originally named Elsa in Elsword's background story.

Elesis is strong-willed but is prone to acting before talking. She would do anything as long as it's for her younger brother, Elsword, who she cares deeply for. Elesis' swordsmanship was taught by her father, a former Velder Kingdom Knight. She mastered her father's teachings quickly while integrating her own unique style. Being unsatisfied with this training in Ruben, Elesis sought out to become a stronger swordsman, thus venturing out into the world of Elrios. After three years, she returned to Ruben bearing the title "Red Haired Knight" and spent time training Elsword. However, the two siblings were ambushed by a horde of demons led by Scar, a Captain of the Demon Realm. Elesis, with the help of her brother Elsword, dispatched Scar and the demons. Elesis had predicted that demons would bring danger to the continent and, as a result, she leaves Ruben and joins the Velder Knights to stop the demon invasion in order to protect Elrios and her younger brother. Elesis is not a part of El search party. Rather, she appears to help them in Velder as she is a Velder knight.

Elesis' feature is called Chivalry, a system a bit similar to Elsword, granted her to enter between two mode: Gale and Annihilation. In Gale mode, certain skills will have reduced mana cost and cooldown, making her capable of spamming skills in rapid succession, although with reduced damage. In Annihilation mode, certain commands and skills will have 100% crit chance, granting extremely high damage while the Annihilation gauge lasts. Also, Mana Breaking while in Annihilation Mode causes her to Stoic Break instead, knocking all enemies back and granting her Super Armor for a few seconds.

She is 16 years old on base job, 18 on 1st job, 19 on 2nd job, and 21 on 3rd job. Elesis is voiced by Yoon Yuh-jin (Korean), Marina Inoue (Japanese), Elisabetta Spinelli (Italian), and Erin Fitzgerald (English).

Class Advancement

Add (Tracer) 
Add, Edward Dmitri Grenore is a descendant of a family that researched Nasods. His entire family was exterminated after being caught researching the forbidden secrets of the Nasods. Add fell into an Ancient Library while escaping and was trapped all alone. Fortunately, there was a steady supply of food to sustain himself as well as a large number of books about the Nasods. Add spent his time reading them and waited for the day he could escape. With his vast knowledge, Add eventually invented the Nasod Dynamo using the parts from broken down Nasods found inside the library. Using the weapon's power, he escaped from the collapsing library. However, the isolation of being trapped alone for so long left Add insane along with an obsession to find rare Nasod codes. While traveling to look for more Nasod schematics, Add finds that the race no longer exists. The library where Add had lived in distorted time inside, and sent him to a timeline far into the future. Thus, Add manipulates Wally in order to gain strength and find a way to get back to the past. That was until Add found traces of Eve from the corrupted Nasod King. Add is technically an enemy of the El Search Party, but officially joins the main cast after the story in Ancient Waterway. His real name is Edward Grenore.

Staying true to his concept of being a mechanic, Add fully utilizes his mechanized weapon, the 'Nasod Dynamo', to aid him in battle. The Dynamos are not only able deal physical damage to targets, but are able to fire rays of electricity as a way of dealing magical damage.  As a ranged alternative, his dynamos can also be configured to form a powerful electric cannon by the same way.
Special Abilities: 
	
Add's features are Dynamo Configuration and Dynamo Mutation. Attacking or getting hit gives Add Dynamo Points.  Having 100 or more Dynamo Points (maximum of 400 Dynamo Points) enables Add to go into Awakening, called 'Configuration'.  During Configuration, Add gains access to special commands and skills.  Configuration has a 5-second cooldown and gives Add 1 Dynamo Mutation Orb (maximum of 6 orbs).  Using certain Skills in Configuration mode consumes the Mutation Orbs - minimum of 1, maximum of 3 - gaining increased damage or added effects per orb consumed.  'Dissolution' cancels Configuration Mode and returns Add to Normal State.

He is 16 years old on base job, 18 on 1st job, 19 on 2nd job, and 20 on 3rd job. Add is voiced by Jeong Jae-heon (Korean), Ryōhei Kimura (Japanese), Renato Novara (Italian), and Bryce Papenbrook (English).

Class Advancement

Lu/Ciel (Demons) 
Lu and  Ciel are the first and only duo characters in Elsword. Lu, or her real name Luciela Rino Sourcream,() was a betrayed demon queen whose body shrunk into a kid, which gained her look and the personality of one. Ciel was a famous assassin in the criminal underworld assassin who was sent to protect Lu, but ended up killed by Karis. Their new contract resulted in Ciel reborn as a demon. His real name Caesar Allegro Orion

Lu and Ciel's special feature is combination skill. Players are able to switch characters while doing combos or performing a skill, which gains a combination point. When the combination gauge is full, players are able to perform a combination skill, which costs no MP or cooldown.

Ciel is 24 years old on base job, 26 on 1st job, 27 on 2nd job, and 29 on 3rd job, while Lu's age is unknown. Lu and Ciel are respectively voiced by Kim Hyeon-ji & Kim Youngsun (Korean), Yuka Iguchi & Noriaki Sugiyama (Japanese), and John C. Hyke (English).

Class Advancement

Rose (Gunner) 
Rose, or her full name Anna Montana Testarosa is a collaboration character between Elsword and Dungeon Fighter Online. Due to this, Rose only encountered the El Search Party members at Elrianode as Water Master Denif's spy. A member of Majestic Garden that protects the Royal City in Heaven. She was given the code name Rose, which is only bestowed to those who are the most powerful of the Majestic Garden. In order to stop the  enemies who threaten Heaven, Rose was given the task to investigate another dimension, Elrios, along with her robot navigator Zero.

Her special features are ECP System and the ability to switch weapons. She is able to switch weapons between Revolvers, Auto-Guns, Hand Cannons, and Muskets. She also able to uses any Active skills without using MP but ECP point instead. When her ECP bar is empty, she is able to enter an Over Strike mode where certain skill's damage increased.

She is 19 years old on base job, 21 on 1st job, 22 on 2nd job, and 24 on 3rd job. Rose is voiced by Lee Yong-sin (Korean) and Ami Koshimizu (Japanese).

Class Advancement

Ain (God's Agent)
Ain, or his full name Ainchase Michel Ishmael is a mysterious man who appears before the El Search Party when they were looking for the missing El Shard. He introduced himself as "a person who is sent by goddess Ishmael", but he is still wrapped in mystery.

Ain's features is called Authority—where he can choose to enter the El's Power: Cycle Magic or Power of God: Creation Magic upon awakened. These ability allows him to adjust himself while fighting in melee or ranged mode. Ain only has 1 awakening bead, but he is able to re-awaken, gaining extra damage increasing up to 3 phases.

His age is listed as unknown, but has the appearance of a 21 years old. As he advanced to Bluhen, his physical appearance seems be grown to a 23 years old. Ain is voiced by Kim Seung-jun (Korean), Shunsuke Takeuchi (Japanese), and Thiago Longo (Brazilian).

Class advancement

Laby (Mysterious Child)
Laby is a mysterious, excitable young girl who came out of the Black Forest. She specializes in hand-to-hand combat, but uses her friend Nisha for long-range combat. She is the first character who has exclusive dungeons and Story Quests. She officially joins the El Search Party after Deep Sea Tunnel. However, she is unconscious until Sea of Ruin.

Laby uses a special system called Sentimental Points. They automatically get consumed while using a special actives that use them and certain command attacks, increasing damage and ignoring damage. Sentimental Points can be regenerated by using Inner Aurora, entering awakening state, and/or using her awakening skill. Instead of awakening when the player presses L-Ctrl, she awakens automatically when her Awakening Gauge is full. This allows her to use an awakening skill, putting surrounding enemies in a groggy state.

Laby's age and race are unknown, but she is implied to be hundreds of years old, considering that the "three mornings' that she experienced in the Black Forest were the Deterioration, Explosion, and Restoration of the El, according to Denif. She is voiced by Jang-Ye Na (Korean), Kato Emiri (Japanese), and Faye Mata (English).

Class Advancement

Noah (Defier of Death) 
Class Advancement

Non playable characters 
These are the more notable non-playable characters that players may encounter during gameplay.

Cobo 
Cobo is a service whose agents' duties are to help the adventurers, from crafting event items to perform a PVP mode. Almost all of them are everywhere except Ruben Village.

Ariel - Representative of Cobo. She has a superb multitasking skills, provides all kinds of things related to event and general items like coin exchange or buying plate name for married people. She is voiced by Miyu Matsuki (Japanese)
Luriel - The younger sister of Ariel, she manages the bank share function. Unlike her sister, Luriel is clumsy, hoping that one day she could be like her sister. She is voiced by Hitomi Harada (Japanese)
Camilla - Handled things related to PVP. She also handling the quest for unlocking some skills. She is voiced by Yui Horie (Japanese)
Myu - A Nasod. Myu is Cobo Product Sales Sector Representative. She was once found in all Villages (except Ruben) during Events; occasionally handles Ariel's role of providing event quests and exchanges. After guild base addition, she becomes an NPC in guild, having the same role as Ariel (but needs to be temporarily unlocked with guild coins)

Ruben 
Hagus - Chief of Ruben Village; gives several quests to warriors and adventurers to prove their strength. Hagus also becomes the pastor for people who married at Ruben Village
Lowe - Camp Drillmaster. He also an "Epic NPC" whom player can defeat in PVP mode and the first ally to replace a player in Gate of Darkness. Lowe's job is Lord Knight
Ann - Shopkeeper; purveyor of the basic equipment needed to explore a dungeon; wrote the skill note Deadly Cosmetics
Adams - After installment of Elrios Studio, he back to the village and becomes the NPC who handles the studio as well as its quests.

Elder Village 
Hoffman - Great Merchant of Elder and head of the Velder Commerce Association; helps with the 1st Class Advancements for most playable characters
Luichel - A former bandit, current accessories shopkeeper of Elder
Echo - Alchemist. She also wrote the skill note Recycling the Ashes
Lenphad - Blacksmith and Equipment shopkeeper; younger brother of Hanna from Velder; works with his sister in the chain of equipment shops, Swordsmith Cats

Bethma 
Stella - Sheriff of Bethma.
Chacha Buch - Alchemist; Vapor's colleague.
Toma - Owns Equipment shop, Acetylene. He is voiced by Rie Kugimiya (Japanese)
Richian - Accessory shopkeeper; brother of Rosean; owns Richie Mine (which his father passed down to him) and one of Luichel's business rivals. He is voiced by Mamoru Miyano (Japanese)

Altera Village 
Altera is the first village in Elsword with no humans (excluding Cobo agents). The inhabitants there are mole-like people called Ponggos. They ended their sentence with "pong".

Adel - Chief of Altera; also teaches young Ponggo about literature and writing.
Agatha - Equipment shopkeeper.
Amos - Alchemist.
Aida - Accessory shopkeeper.

Feita 
The only town where all NPCs (unique, Cobo, and Glave) are in one place, since Feita is considered as a camp, not town.

Lento - Knight of Feita Altar; Allegro's bodyguard
Allegro - Lord of Feita's Assistant

Belder 
The capital of Elrios continent. It is the kingdom that holds the Earth El, until it is attacked by Lu and Ciel. By the time of El Search Party's arrival, it was completely run over by the demon and those who escaped settled in the suburbs which serves the town in Velder region.
Vanessa - Velder Garrison Centurion. She also appears in Ereda Island as one of Velder's Spearman Chief Gatekeepers. Vanessa wrote the skill notes Deep Cut and Seamless Spearmanship. She is voiced by Miyu Matsuki (Japanese)
Hanna - Equipment shopkeeper; Lenphad's older sister who runs Swordsmith Cats
Grail - Alchemist; became a dog after a failed experiment. He is voiced by Rie Kugimiya (Japanese)
Praus - Accessory shopkeeper; likes Hanna but was rejected by goddess Ishmael.
Noel - Wandering Bard; former mercenary; acted as a tactician to help Vanessa and the El Search Party during the Velder Invasion

Hamel 
Penensio - Chief of the Red Knights whose job is Rune Slayer; also appears in PvP as an "Epic" NPC and in Gate of Darkness as the third ally to replace a player. He is voiced by Hideki Ogihara (Japanese)
Daisy - Secretary of Duke Rod Ross who greatly admires him
Horatio - Equipment shopkeeper; aka the "Flaming Horatio"; wrote the skill notes Opportunity Chance, Earth Quake, Scars of Burns and Armor Destroyer. He is voiced by Yōsuke Akimoto (Japanese)
Lucy - Accessory shopkeeper. She is voiced by Rei Matsuzaki (Japanese)
Denka - Alchemist. He is voiced by Shinya Fukumatsu (Japanese)
Rod Ross - Duke of Hamel. Doesn't appear at all at the village

Sander 
Emirate - Village Chief; aka "Red Beard". Always with his sheep
Rosean - Accessory shopkeeper; sister of Richian
Dafarr – Equipment shopkeeper; weapons expert; wrote the skill note Imbalanced Weight
Vapor - Alchemist; colleague of Chacha Buch

Lanox 
Edel - Chief of Lanox who sits on wheelchair.
Steel - Equipment shopkeeper; 13-year-old Dwarf Blacksmith; only 140 cm tall but weighs over 70 kg; Sdeing's daughter
Sdeing - Blacksmith Leader; boss of Ash Covered Village. After defeating him, he will appears next to his daughter Steel
Aesop - Alchemist; real name unknown; lost his face while using a forbidden alchemy to resurrect the dead, according to rumors. To hide it, he wears a paper bag with a picture drawn by his daughter
Ember Ryota - Androgynous accessory shopkeeper
Ignia - Fire Priestess. After her betrayal, she no longer appears in the village. She is later reformed, and performed a ritual along with other Priestesses to send the El Search Party to Elysion. She and the other Priestesses returned in Elrianode.
Sebastian - Edel's butler

Elysion

Atlas Station 
Yuno - Third generation Nasod; manager of the Atlas Station.
Nono - Yuno's robot friend. Replaces him after Yuno's sacrifice in Elysion Tower.

Elysion City 
Bernard - Elysion Mayor
Durenda - Equipment Shop owner
Theodore - Accessory Shop owner
Hugo - Alchemist

Elrianode City 
Denif - The El Master of Water

General NPCs 
Helen - Peddler; found in all Resting Areas. She is voiced by Miyu Matsuki (Japanese)
Glave - Henir's Time and Space Administrator; found in all Resting Areas and Feita Village. He is voiced by Mamoru Miyano (Japanese)
Luto - Former Henir's Time and Space Administrator. Now he appears in Secret Dungeons and if he appeared, he will summons a door to the Luto Mode. which is more difficult but yield more rewards.

Priestess 
Sasha - Water Priestess. She was kidnapped by Ran; released after player defeats Ran.
Anudran - Wind Priestess. She was kidnapped by Kelaino (under Karis' command); released after player defeats True Karis.
Ignia - Fire Priestess. Manipulated by Scar to kidnap Gloria and Darkmoon.
Artea - Earth Priestess. She was kidnapped by Ignia; released after player defeats Ignia.
Gloria - Light Priestess. She was kidnapped by Sdeing; released after player defeats Sdeing.
Darkmoon - Dark Priestess. She was kidnapped by Sdeing; released after player defeats Sdeing.
All Priestesses are also present in Elrianode.

Epic NPCs 
Epic NPCs are kind of NPCs player can encounter in PVP. Each of them have the same fight mode (even model and voices) as some of classes in Elsword, with some benefit only them can have. All Epic NPCs also have great natural mana regeneration; they can spam skills and only can be stopped with the skill's cooldown.

Lowe (Lord Knight)
Penesio (Rune Slayer)
Ice Princess, Noah (Elemental Master) - A member of the Imperial Knight Guards of Velder. Noah is called "The Princess of Ice", due to her phobia to fire and only learned ice and water elemental skills.
Shadow Witch, Speka (Void Princess) - A girl who loved darkness and dark magic so much that she becomes a dark magician. She is known as an extremely cruel and harsh witch who is very serious in battle.
Green Forest Ranger, Lime (Wind Sneaker)
Wind Shooter, Amelia (Grand Archer)
Blood Colonel, Edan (Blade Master)
Lord of Pain, Valak (Reckless Fist)
Code: Q-Proto_00 (Code: Nemesis) - Known as one of the most powerful Ancient Nasod Prototype Drones. Developed by Apple, Q-Proto was only meant as a testing product, which is why she has no installed emotions. Unlike Eve's Code: Nemesis, Q-Proto has infinite duration of Queen's Throne.
Ancient Nasod Princess, Apple (Code: Empress)
Veteran Blood Demon, Noma (Grand Master) - Event Epic NPC.

Antagonists
Banthus - A bandit leader who stole the El Stone from El Tree of Ruben.
Wally - The mayor of Elder town who tasked Banthus to steal the El Stone for his Nasod research.
Kayak the Shaman - A Lizardman conspirator who serves as a villain in Bethma.
King Nasod - The leader of Nasod who aimed to revive his race using the El Stone of Ruben. His true name is "Adam", the first advanced Nasod ever created.
Berthe - A demon who first appeared in Ruben who attempted to steal the Ruben's El Stone but repelled by Elsword. He returned as the gate keeper of the portal from Demon World.
Chloe - A dark elf who lead the invasion of Velder. She is repelled by the El Search Party and escaped to Hamel to serve as Ran's henchman.
Ran - The demon leading the invasion of Hamel. He is revealed to be a former human named Aren who is Ara's brother.
Karis - The succubus queen who kidnapped the Wind Priestess to use to awaken the primordial beast Behemoth. She is also one of Lu's most bitter enemies.
In and Jin - Twin demons serving General Scar. They are the cause of anomalies happening in Lanox region.
Scar - A demon general who holds a ritual to awaken the Demon God Sult which caused chaos to Elrios continent.
Solace - The El Master of Sun. He held the El Lady as hostage. However, he only did so to protect her.
Hennon - The Henir fanatic who lead the invasion of Henir's forces to Elrianode and the El Tower.

The El Masters 
Gaia - The El Master of Earth
Denif - The El Master of Water
Ebalon - The El Master of Moon
Rosso - The El Master of Fire
Ventus - The El Master of Wind

Other characters 
Hernia - the El Lady and the current avatar of Goddess Ishmael.
Adrian - creator of the Nasod race. He left Elrios to Elysion before the extinction on Nasod race. He created more advanced Nasods in Elysion and lived for hundreds of years there.
Goddess Elria - the ancient goddess who created the material world.
Goddess Ishmael - a goddess serving Elria who created the world's life force by sending divine gems (i.e. El) to the world; tasked a mortal (Hernia aka El Lady) to be her avatar to keep the El alive.
Henir - the primordial god of darkness.

References

External links 
 List of Elsword Characters at North America server 

Lists of game characters